The 1934–35 CHL season was the fourth and final season of the Central Hockey League, a minor professional ice hockey league in the Midwestern United States. Three teams participated in the league, and the St. Paul Saints won the championship.

Regular season

External links
Season on hockeydb.com

1934 in ice hockey
1935 in ice hockey